George Garrett may refer to:

*George Garrard (MP) (aka George Garrett) (1579–c. 1650), English politician
George Garrett (MP) (died 1648), English alderman and Sheriff of London
George Garrett (composer) (1834–1897), English composer
George Garrett (inventor) (1852–1902), English clergyman and inventor
George A. Garrett (1888–1971), United States diplomat
George Garrett (activist) (1896–1966), English labour activist and writer
George Garrett (hurler) (1908–1969), Irish hurler
George Garrett (poet) (1929–2008), American writer
George Garrett (cricketer) (born 2000), English cricketer

See also
George Garratt (1882–?), English footballer